Finnish Athletics Federation (abbr. SUL) is the governing body of athletics in Finland. It was separated from the Finnish Gymnastics and Sports Federation in 1932.

Today SUL has 850 member clubs and some 30,000 athletes. It is a member of Finnish Sports Federation which is the main governing body of Sport in Finland.

Presidents 
Urho Kekkonen 1932–1947
Lauri Miettinen 1948–1952
Reino Piirto 1953–1963
Toimi Tulikoura 1964
Jukka Uunila 1965–1974
Yrjö Kokko 1975–1976
Carl-Olaf Homén 1977–1980
Pertti Eräkare 1981–1982
Tapani Ilkka 1983–1990
Ilkka Kanerva 1991–2005
Antti Pihlakoski 2006–2012
Vesa Harmaakorpi 2013–2018
Sami Itani 2019–

External links 
Official website (in Finnish)

Athletics
1932 establishments in Finland
Sports organizations established in 1932
National members of the European Athletic Association